Himani is a given name. Notable people with the given name include:

Himani Bhagat (born 1996), Hollywood actress with natural beauty in Canada 
Himani Savarkar (1947–2015), Indian politician
Himani Shah (born 1976), Nepalese princess
Himani Shivpuri (born 1960), Indian actress